Joseph Patrick Redmond (born 23 January 2000) is an Irish professional footballer who plays as a defender for League of Ireland Premier Division club St Patrick's Athletic.

Club career

Youth career
A native of Tallaght, County Dublin, Redmond began playing  with his local side Kilnamanagh#Clubs, associations and societies|Kilnamanagh]], before moving to top Dublin academy Crumlin United and before moving to St Joseph's Boys. In 2016, Redmond had agreed to sign for the under-17 side of League of Ireland club St Patrick's Athletic, but he instead signed for EFL Championship side Birmingham City in July 2016, starting out in their Academy.

Birmingham City

Academy
On 23 June 2018, Redmond signed his first professional contract with Birmingham City, signing a one year contract, with the option of another year. He signed a new two year contract with the club on 27 June 2019 following an impressive first professional season with the club's reserve side. Redmond's first involvement in a matchday squad with the first team came on 6 August 2019 when he was an unused substitute in an EFL Cup game away to Portsmouth.

Cork City loan
On 31 January 2020, Redmond was loaned out to League of Ireland Premier Division club Cork City until 30 June 2020. He made his debut for the club on 14 February 2020 in the opening game of the season as his side lost 1–0 to Shelbourne at Turners Cross. He featured in each of the clubs opening 5 games, losing 4 and winning 1 game before season came to a halt due to the COVID-19 pandemic.

Return from loan
On 22 May 2020, Redmond was recalled from his loan spell with the League of Ireland on a break due to the COVID-19 pandemic. Redmond became captain of the club's Under-23 team upon his return from loan. On 17 May 2021, it was announced by the club that Redmond was among the list of players that would not be retained by the club following the end of their contracts. A few days after learning of his upcoming release by the club, he scored a 117th minute volley to help his side to a 2–1 win over Bristol City in the Professional Development League semi-final at Ashton Gate Stadium. On 24 May 2021, Redmond opened the scoring in a 2–0 win over Sheffield United at Bramall Lane to lift the Professional Development League trophy as captain on what was his last game for the club.

Drogheda United
On 11 August 2021, Redmond signed for League of Ireland Premier Division club Drogheda United until the end of the season. He made his debut for the club on 15 August 2021 in a 1–0 loss at home to Shamrock Rovers. Redmond scored his first goal in senior football on 11 September 2021 in a 3–2 win at home to Bohemians. Over the season, Redmond made a total of 13 appearances, scoring 1 goal as his side avoided relegation by finishing in 7th place in their first season back in the League of Ireland Premier Division.

St Patrick's Athletic

2022 season
Redmond followed Drogheda United manager Tim Clancy in signing for Dublin club St Patrick's Athletic on 18 December 2021 ahead of their 2022 season. Upon signing for the club, Redmond revealed that he grew up as a fan of the club and attended the recent 2021 FAI Cup Final as a fan in the Pat's end of the ground. On 11 February 2022, Redmond made his debut for the club in the 2022 President of Ireland's Cup against Shamrock Rovers at Tallaght Stadium, as his side lost 5–4 on penalties after a 1–1 draw. On 18 February 2022, Redmond made his league debut for the club in a 3–0 win over rivals Shelbourne at Tolka Park. He was voted as Player of the Month by the club's fans for the month of March 2022. On 8 April 2022, he was named as Man of the Match by RTÉ Sport for his performance in his side's 0–0 draw with Dundalk at Richmond Park. He was voted the club's Player of the Month for the second month running for April 2022. Redmond's early form with the club was rewarded with a contract extension when it was announced on 12 May 2022 that he had signed a new long term contract with the club after remaining an ever present in a defence that kept 8 clean sheets in the first 15 games of the season. Redmond scored his first goal for the club on 20 May 2022 against Shelbourne in a Dublin derby. Redmond made his first appearance in European football on 21 July 2022, captaining the side in a 1–1 draw with Slovenian side NŠ Mura in the UEFA Europa Conference League. In the second leg a week later, he scored the winning penalty in the shootout as Pat's advanced 6–5 on penalties after a 0–0 draw to earn a tie with Bulgarian side CSKA Sofia in the next round. Mid-way through the season, he was made captain of the side following club captain Ian Bermingham being left out the team on a regular basis. At the club's awards night, it was revealed that Redmond had been voted by supporters as the Player of the Year following an excellent first season at the club.

2023 season
Redmond started off the 2023 season off to a goalscoring start on 17 February 2023, scoring an 89th minute equaliser in a 1–1 draw with Derry City in the opening game of the season at Richmond Park.

International career
Redmond has played for the Republic of Ireland at U16, U17 & U18 level. In March 2022, he was called up to the Republic of Ireland U21 squad by manager Jim Crawford for their qualifier away to Sweden U21. On 15 September 2022, Redmond was called up to the U21 squad for their 2023 UEFA European Under-21 Championship Qualification Play-off games against Israel U21. He made his debut for the U21s on 23 September 2022 in a 1–1 draw with Israel U21 in the first leg at Tallaght Stadium, drawing praise from manager Jim Crawford after the match, stating "Joe was excellent, it's the way he plays at his club, he was a rock and I knew, I had no qualms at all. He's captain at his club, a young captain and he had a big performance for us."

Personal life
Redmond comes from a footballing family with several of his relatives having played the game at a professional level. His cousins Stephen Quinn (who also played for St Patrick's Athletic), Alan Quinn and Keith Quinn have all played professionally in England. Redmond grew up as a fan of St Patrick's Athletic, watching fellow centre backs Kenny Browne and Conor Kenna during the club's 2013 league winning season.

Career statistics

Club

References

2000 births
Living people
Sportspeople from South Dublin (county)
Association football defenders
Crumlin United F.C. players
Birmingham City F.C. players
Cork City F.C. players
Drogheda United F.C. players
St Patrick's Athletic F.C. players
League of Ireland players
Association footballers from County Dublin
Republic of Ireland association footballers
Republic of Ireland youth international footballers